Beatmania IIDX 21: Spada (stylized as beatmaniaIIDX 21 SPADA) is a music video game and the 21st installment of Beatmania IIDX series of video games. The main motif of the game revolves around swords, as the title of the game, Spada is Italian for sword. The UI has a medieval fantasy theme and mainly features black, brown, and red colors. It was first announced on June 12, 2013. Location tests began in Akihabara on June 14, 2013 and ended on June 16, 2013. It was released on November 13, 2013.

Gameplay 
For more information about the gameplay of Beatmania IIDX in general, please refer to Beatmania IIDX#Gameplay.

Beatmania IIDX tasks the player with performing songs through a controller consisting of seven key buttons and a scratchable turntable. Hitting the notes with strong timing increases the score and groove gauge bar, allowing the player to finish the stage. Failing to do so depletes the gauge until it is empty, abruptly ending the song.

Beatmania IIDX 21: Spada still retains the same basic gameplay since the start of the series. Players are required to hit notes that fall from the top of the screen at the hit zone using keys or turntables which are required to be scratched. Hitting the notes correctly will fill up the Groove Meter, while failure to do so drains it. Players must attain at least 80% of the meter at the end of the song to pass. Two gameplay variations introduced in Beatmania IIDX 17: Sirius: Charge Note (notes required to be held) and Backspin Scratch (spin the turntable at one direction and spin it at the opposite direction at the end) are once again present. Players can now freely change between Single and Double Play during song select screen. The Results Screen has also been overhauled. The keypad used for inputting e-Amusement code can now be used to sort difficulty and music folders in-game.

Unlocking system

Spada†leggendaria
In this game, players can still access the normal Extra Stage with the same requirements from previous games; similar to Beatmania IIDX 20: Tricoro's Limit Burst Unlocking System, new boss songs were added to the new system called "Spada†leggendaria". In addition to fulfilling the normal Extra Stages, the player must play a specific set of songs (all are in Final Stage) to obtain new boss songs. These boss songs are exclusive to this version and the authors of the songs are based on the name of the Swords. As with Limit Burst, there is no One More Extra Stage. The songs are:
 Close the World feat. a☆ru (Final Stage for that song must be related to Swords, Crosses or Knights)
 Sigmund (Final Stage for that song must be composed by DJ Genki)
 Ancient Scapes (Final Stage for that song must be composed by DJ Noriken)
 invoker (Final Stage for that song must be composed by USAO)
 Feel The Beat  (Final Stage for that song must be composed by DJ Shimamura)
 疾風迅雷 (Final Stage for that song must be composed by OSTER Project)
 Verflucht (Final Stage for that song must be composed by Hommarju)

Similar to Limit Burst, the player can only access the Another chart of the song initially; the Normal and Hyper charts are added through the period of two weeks after the song was released as the next Spada†leggendaria song was added on the first weekday of the month (until July).

Starting on April 23, 2014, Players playing via Paseli (Which was also the only way to access Extra Stages after the change for the Japanese arcades) can also access the alternate version of the previous Spada†leggendaria songs by spending six V-Disks (or three if both players were playing) out of seven given at the start under the Leggendaria folder. Those alternate versions of the songs are generally the same as the first (songs with "†leggendaria" simply added in their title), except that it has difficult Another charts (since HEROIC VERSE, Leggendaria charts have their own difficulty).

Upon the release of PENDUAL on September 17, 2014, all the songs (including Leggendaria Charts) would still be locked and can only be accessed on Extra Stage via Paseli on the Leggendaria folder.

Qprogue
Qprogue is the first unlockable event of the game (based on a Role-Playing Game) which started on December 25, 2013. In this event players can control their avatar (or Kupuro) through the map by using the game keyboard or the numerical buttons upon every credit of gameplay. While players can defeat monsters by reducing the enemies' HP (reducing the player's stamina in the process), the avatar will level up (up to 28) as well as unlock more charts, items, weapons and skills (can be toggled by pressing the Effect Button) thus giving the player the advantage against certain enemies. In order to progress to the next phrase's map, the player must have unlocked the Another Chart of the boss song of this Chapter before the player can move on (the player can revisit the maps by visiting the portals. For QProgueDX, it can be toggled using the Vefx Button). Some songs are also locked in forts and players must play the required note charts of certain songs under forced difficulty (depending on the level chosen in each playthrough) to unlock them.

After April 30, 2014, the 4th map, QProgue DX, is made mandatory to play for all players. Players who did not unlock the songs after this date may unlock this new map. If all the charts has been unlocked and all enemies were defeated, the player has completed the event and all the accessories can be used for regular gameplay.

There are four maps in this event and 25 songs have to be unlocked for regular play. The event ended on September 17, 2014, which unlocks all the songs automatically.

Super Star Mitsuru Revival Event
Super Star Mitsuru Revival Event was started on March 26, 2014. Through this event, the player can unlock eight customisation designs and shop items (billed as "Only One" items) by fulfilling the in-game conditions which relate to the wordplay number 326 in the first three stages of gameplay (similar to Legend Cross from IIDX Tricoro). Every time the condition is fulfilled (such as getting 326 on the note counts or BPM Total, or play songs that relate or come from the numbers 3, 2 and 6), new items will be made available in the Shop (but it is not mandatory to purchase them in the case of unlocking the song). If at least four criteria were fulfilled and have at least four customisation items available for purchase, Smug Face -どうだ, オレの生き様は- (Only One Edition) will be unlocked automatically for regular gameplay. Unlocking all the eight customization items in the shop will also unlock I will be back -オレは帰ってきた-.

Like QProgue, the event ended on September 17, 2014, which automatically unlocks the two songs (some of the accessories and customization items were discounted).

Music 
Currently, there are 90 new songs. While 21 songs from the older versions were removed, the remaining songs have returned for a total of 846 songs available in this game, although some songs must be unlocked by fulfilling requirements in-game.

Song names in parenthesis represent the direct translation of Japanese titles. Song names in bold represent the official in-game translation through the arcade machine's LED marquee.

Notes

References

External links 
 Official location test site 
  
 beatmaniaIIDX 21 SPADA on Bemaniwiki 

Arcade video games
Arcade-only video games
Beatmania games
Japan-exclusive video games
Multiplayer and single-player video games
2013 video games
Video games developed in Japan